Biggie: I Got a Story to Tell is a 2021 American biographical documentary film created for Netflix and directed by Emmett Malloy. The film offers a look into the life and musical career of rapper Christopher Wallace, better known by his stage names The Notorious B.I.G. and Biggie Smalls. It uses rare footage filmed by Wallace's close friend Damion "D-Roc" Butler along with interviews with family and friends, to offer an alternative perspective into Wallace's life. The film was released on March 1, 2021.

References

External links 

2021 films
2021 documentary films
American documentary films
Films about music and musicians
American biographical films
2020s English-language films
2020s American films